Procellosaurinus is a genus of lizards in the family Gymnophthalmidae. They are endemic to Brazil.

Species
Procellosaurinus erythrocercus  – Rodrigues's red teiid
Procellosaurinus tetradactylus  – Rodrigues's four-fingered teiid

References 

 
Lizard genera
Taxa named by Miguel Trefaut Rodrigues